Jan M. Van Tamelen (January 16, 1912 – February 22, 1995) was an American art director. He was nominated for two Primetime Emmy Awards in the category Outstanding Art Direction for his work on the television program Mannix. Van Tamelen died in February 1995 in Woodland Hills, California, at the age of 83. He was buried in Pierce Brothers Valley Oaks Memorial Park.

References

External links 

1912 births
1995 deaths
People from Zeeland
American art directors
Burials at Valley Oaks Memorial Park